Mercy is an American medical drama television series created by Liz Heldens, which aired on NBC from September 23, 2009, to May 12, 2010. The series initially aired on Wednesday at 8:00 pm (ET), as part of the 2009 fall season, but was pushed back to 9:00 pm in April.

On October 23, 2009, Mercy was picked up for a full 22-episode first season. On May 14, 2010, NBC cancelled the series after one season.

Plot
Mercy is an ensemble drama set in the fictional Mercy Hospital in Jersey City, New Jersey. The show focuses on the lives of three nurses. Veronica Flanagan Callahan (Taylor Schilling) is a nurse who has just returned from a tour of duty in Iraq, while Sonia Jimenez (Jaime Lee Kirchner), her best friend, has become seriously involved with a police officer, and Chloe Payne (Michelle Trachtenberg) is a recent nursing graduate who is thrown into the world of nursing and is unprepared for what it entails.

Cast

Main
 Taylor Schilling as Veronica Agnes Flanagan Callahan
 Michelle Trachtenberg as Chloe Payne
 Jaime Lee Kirchner as Sonia Jimenez
 James Tupper as Dr. Chris Sands
 Diego Klattenhoff as Mike Callahan
 Guillermo Díaz as Ángel García
 James LeGros as Dr. Dan Harris

Recurring
 David Call as Paul Kempton
 Delroy Lindo as Dr. Alfred Parks
 Kate Mulgrew as Jeannie Flanagan
 Peter Gerety as Jim Flanagan
 Michael Chernus as Ryan Flanagan
 Patch Darragh as Tim Flanagan
 Johnny Hopkins as Bobby Flanagan
 Charlie Semine as Nick Valentino
 K.K. Moggie as Dr. Gillian Jelani
 Margo Martindale as Helen Klowden
 Jill Flint as Simone Sands
 James Van Der Beek as Dr. Joe Briggs, new Chief of the ICU
 Mary Stuart Masterson as Dr. Denise Cabe
 Kelly Bishop as Lauren Kempton

Development and production
NBC producer Jim Bigwood selected the warehouse at 10 Enterprise Avenue in Secaucus, New Jersey as the filming location for the series. The show occasionally also filmed inside a private residence in Weehawken, New Jersey. The production left New Jersey for New York in 2010, however, when New Jersey Governor Chris Christie suspended the tax credits for film and television production for the fiscal year 2011 to close budget gaps.

Some interior shots for the show were filmed in the unused Barnert Hospital in Paterson, New Jersey. in the old St Mary's Hospital in Passaic. Exterior shots of Mercy Hospital were taken of the back side of a public school on 4th street (between Newark Ave. and Colgate St.) in Jersey City, New Jersey. The exterior of Lucky 7's Bar was filmed at a location on the corner of 2nd and Coles Street in Jersey City. The interior of the bar was the Park Tavern located on West Side Avenue off Communipaw Avenue in Jersey City. The exterior shots of The Red Fox Saloon were filmed at the Monaghan House in South Amboy, New Jersey. The interior shots of the Saloon were filmed at Ted's Bar in the Morgan area of Sayreville, New Jersey.

Mercy was originally slated to begin midseason, but was moved to the fall after the premiere of Parenthood was pushed to 2010 due to production issues.

Episodes

Critical reception
Mercy received a score of 41 of 100 from the review aggregator Metacritic, and received mixed to negative reviews from critics. Matthew Gilbert, from The Boston Globe, referred to the show as "a bunch of played-out hospital clichés" and said it "follows the hospital melodrama blueprint way too closely."  Similarly, a review in The Hollywood Reporter calls the show "just another hospital soap opera" and "a lethal cocktail of virtually every medical drama ever seen on TV". Matt Roush of TV Guide wrote "Nurses deserve better than this ludicrous potboiler".  Several critics have referred to Mercy as a weak copy of Showtime's Nurse Jackie.

The show's writing has been criticized as "twisting itself into a pretzel to provide ironies," and a review by Maureen Ryan of the Chicago Tribune states that "all the characters are so thinly drawn." In a review in the Pittsburgh Post-Gazette, Rob Owen said the show "hits viewers over the head with its thesis statement that nurses are under-appreciated."  Robert Bianco from USA Today stated that "remarkably good actors [are] going to waste here."

On the positive side, in a review in The Daily Telegraph, Rachel Ray found the show "utterly enjoyable" and "marvelous television", while praising the "clicking pace, real-person dialogue, excellent writing, a fresh story line, and thoughtful acting". (Although the review was for a UK paper's online edition, the series did not air on British TV.) Noting an effort by NBC to find a replacement for the former standout ER, David Hinckley, from the New York Daily News, favorably compared the two shows and stated that Mercy "comes the closest yet to capturing that chemistry."

Ratings

Seasonal ratings

Home media

References

External links
 
 

2000s American drama television series
2000s American medical television series
2009 American television series debuts
2010s American drama television series
2010s American medical television series
2010 American television series endings
English-language television shows
NBC original programming
Television series by Universal Television
Television shows set in New Jersey
Television shows filmed in New Jersey